Dysommina proboscideus is an eel in the family Synaphobranchidae (cutthroat eels). It was described by Einar Hagbart Martin Lea in 1913. It is a subtropical, marine eel which is known from the eastern central Atlantic Ocean. It is known to dwell at a depth of 150 metres.

References

Synaphobranchidae
Fish described in 1913